Compact governments or compacts were the conservative colonial cliques that ruled colonies, particularly in British North America prior to the granting of responsible government. They were usually Tory in orientation and representative of the local elite. Compacts exercised their influence through unelected Legislative Councils in the era when governments were formed by appointment of the Lieutenant-Governor and did not rely on the confidence of the elected House of Assembly.

Examples include the Family Compact that had influence over Upper Canada and Lower Canada's Château Clique, though similar compacts held sway in pre-Confederation New Brunswick, Nova Scotia and Prince Edward Island.

Political history of Canada